The 1975–76 Yale Bulldogs men's basketball team represented Yale University during the 1975–76 men's college basketball season. The Bulldogs, led by 1st year head coach Ray Carazo, played their home games at John J. Lee Amphitheater of the Payne Whitney Gymnasium and were members of the Ivy League. They finished the season 7–21, 5–9 in Ivy League play to finish in last place.

Schedule

References 

Yale Bulldogs men's basketball seasons
Yale
Yale Bulldogs
Yale Bulldogs